Leavenworth Normal School located in Leavenworth, Kansas was a state-funded normal school operated by the Kansas state government from 1870 until 1876.

Leavenworth Normal began on May 3, 1870, and John Wherrell was named president of the college. by 1874, about 100 students were enrolled including C. M. Arbuthnot.  The school also maintained student housing.

Depending upon state aid, the school closed a little after Concordia Normal School which met the same fate. Following the "Miscellaneous appropriations bill of 1876" state normal schools were then consolidated to what is now Emporia State University

Notable alumni 
 James H. Brady, eighth Governor of Idaho

References

Education in Leavenworth County, Kansas
Defunct universities and colleges in Kansas
Educational institutions established in 1870
1870 establishments in Kansas
1876 disestablishments in Kansas
Educational institutions disestablished in 1876